Guindy is one of the most important neighborhoods of Chennai, Tamil Nadu, and is nicknamed as The Gateway to Chennai. The Kathipara junction where Anna Salai, Mount-Poonamallee Road, Inner Ring Road, 100 Feet Road or Jawaharlal Nehru Road, and GST Road meet here. It is one of the important nodal points of road traffic in the metropolitan area. It is also a commercial hub. Here is headquarters of Ashok Leyland This junction serves as the entry point to the city limits from the suburbs. It is surrounded by Saidapet in the North, Kotturpuram and Adyar towards the East, Velachery in the South, Adambakkam and Alandur in the South-West, Parangimalai in the West and Ekkatutthangal in the North-West. Guindy is home to many important landmarks in the city, the most famous amongst them being the Guindy National Park. It also serves as a main hub for several small and medium scale industries (Guindy Thiru Vi Ka Estate). Transportation to/from the neighborhood is catered by Guindy railway station and Guindy metro station.

Etymology 

The precise origin of the word is unclear. According to legends in Tamil Saivism, sage Bringi is said to have performed penance on the Parangimalai hill (called St.Thomas Mount by Britishers), before which he had to circumambulate the regions surrounding the hillock (as hills were considered abode of god Siva). The place where he completed the circumambulation and left his kindi (vessel) before starting the journey to the hilltop is said to have been named as kiṇḍi, and later the region's name was anglicized as Guindy during the British Raj.

Transportation 
Guindy is well connected by road and train services. Many buses ply through Guindy and connect it to the rest of Chennai. It is also well connected by the trains with Chennai Suburban Railway and Chennai Metro. Guindy is also located 10 km away from the airport.

Government House and Guindy under the British Raj

The governor lived in Government House, Fort St. George, a palatial residence with numerous servants, and had an official Daimler car at his disposal. There was a head butler called Muniswami, who ruled with a rod of iron. For the governor's ceremonial use, there was a glittering coach with prancing horses, accompanied by a bodyguard of Indian troopers with red uniforms, glittering steel accoutrements and pennoned lances.

There was also Guindy, a spacious and elegant country home on the outskirts of Madras, surrounded by an extensive park. Nearby were a golf course, hockey pitches, riding stables and the Guindy Horse Racing Track.  
From May to October each year during the hot season, the Madras Government and its officials, the governor and his family went to Government House in the hill station of Ooty or Ootacamund in the Nilgiri Hills.

Location in context

Important landmarks
 Guindy Race Course
 Guindy National Park
 Raj Bhavan, Chennai
 College of Engineering, Guindy
 Anna University Chennai
 Indian Institute of Technology, Madras
 Snake Park
 Cancer Research Institute
 Guindy Thiru Vi Ka Estate
 Guindy Links

References

Neighbourhoods in Chennai
Cities and towns in Chennai district